Steve Young (born 1961) is a retired American football quarterback and member of the Pro Football Hall of Fame.

Steve Young or Steven Young may also refer to:

Steve Young (academic) (born 1951), British academic and entrepreneur
Steve Young (musician) (1942–2016), country music singer, songwriter and guitarist
Steve Young (writer), television writer
Steve Young (police officer), labor leader
Stevie Young, guitarist, member of AC/DC
Steve Young (offensive tackle), American football tackle
Steve Young (Alberta politician), politician in the Canadian province of Alberta
Steve Young (basketball) ("Steve Giatzoglou"), Greek-American professional basketball player
Steve Young (Washington politician), former mayor of Kennewick, Washington
Steve Young, a telecommunications executive who flew into space on Blue Origin NS-22

See also
Stephen Young (disambiguation)